Charlotte Amy Jacks, commonly known as Charlie Jacks, is an English former Page 3 glamour model turned pop singer, based in southeast London. She began singing as child. She had six #1 albums and nine singles at the top of the Japanese iTunes chart. Her single "Come On" sold 35,000 copies in a single day.

In 2012, Jacks signed a management deal with BoomHaus Recordings, Sony Music Japan, Manhattan Records Lexington Corp (JP) She released her recent single, "Speakerphone" 16 August 2012 as a free download.

Her mother is the Sun newspaper's official Page 3 photographer, Alison Webster, and her stepfather is the Sun's former deputy editor, Geoff Webster.

Discography 

 Charlie's Party (2008)
 Charlie (2011)
 Everyone Falls in Love (2011)
 Charlie 2 (2011)
 Complete Charlie (2008)
 Basketcase (2011)
 Alone (2011)
 The Industry (2008)
 Gimme Gimme (2011)
 Charlie (2011)
 Charlie (2013)

Singles

 Waiting For Love (2011)
 A Perfect Sky (2011)
 Last Christmas (2011)
 Sweet 10 Covers~music for lovers (2012)
"Not Over You (single)' (2013)

Extended plays
Speakerphone (2012)

References

External links 
 

1985 births
Living people
Models from London
English women guitarists
English guitarists
English women singer-songwriters
English soul singers
People from Bromley
Singers from London
Torch singers
XL Recordings artists
English people of Welsh descent
Musicians from Kent
21st-century English women singers
21st-century English singers
21st-century British guitarists
21st-century women guitarists